Florent Hoti (born 11 December 2000) is a professional footballer who plays as a midfielder for the Kosovo national under-21 team. He has previously played for Rochdale, Dundee United and Arbroath, and had a loan spell at Forfar Athletic. As well as Kosovo, he is eligible to represent England (where he was born) and Albania internationally.

Club career
Having been part of Rochdale's academy since the age of 10, Hoti signed for the club on a two-year scholarship in 2017. He made his debut for Rochdale on 4 September 2018, coming on as a 79th minute substitute in a 2–1 home victory against Bury in the EFL Trophy. On 7 November 2018, he started in Rochdale's 2–2 draw at home to Leicester City Under-23s in the EFL Trophy. Hoti was offered his first professional contract with the club at the end of the 2018–19 season.

Hoti had a trial at Scottish Premiership club Dundee United in August 2020, and signed a two-year contract with the club for an undisclosed fee the following month. He joined Scottish League One club Forfar Athletic on loan in October, then returned to Dundee United in January 2021 following the suspension of the lower divisions due to the COVID-19 pandemic. He made his debut for Dundee United on 10 April 2021 in a 1–0 Scottish Premiership win away to Hamilton Academical, with Dundee United manager Micky Mellon stating that "he has come on and showed what a lad of great promise he is."

On 11 November 2022, Hoti signed for Scottish Championship side Arbroath on a short-term deal. On 25 January 2023, Arbroath confirmed that Florent had left the club.

International career
Hoti was selected to participate in an Albania national under-21 team's training camp and practice matches in March 2021, but was unable to join the squad due to COVID-related travel restrictions. Two months later, he received a call-up from Kosovo national under-21 team for a 2023 UEFA European Under-21 Championship qualification match against Andorra U21, and made his debut after being named in the starting line-up.

Personal life
Hoti was born in Manchester, England, to Kosovo-Albanian parents, making him eligible to represent all three nations internationally.

Career statistics

References

External links

 
 

2000 births
Living people
English footballers
Kosovan footballers
Kosovo under-21 international footballers
English people of Kosovan descent
English people of Albanian descent
Footballers from Manchester
Association football midfielders
Rochdale A.F.C. players
Dundee United F.C. players
Forfar Athletic F.C. players
Arbroath F.C. players
Scottish Professional Football League players